AMD Athlon X4 is a series of budget AMD microprocessors for personal computers. These processors are distinct from A-Series APUs of the same era due to the lack of iGPUs.

"Richland" (2013, 32 nm)
 Socket FM2
 CPU: Two or four Piledriver-cores
 GPU TeraScale 3 (VLIW4)
 MMX, SSE(1, 2, 3, 3s, 4a, 4.1, 4.2), AMD64, AMD-V, AES, AVX(1, 1.1), XOP, FMA(4, 3), CVT16, F16C, BMI(ABM, TBM), Turbo Core 3.0, NX bit
 PowerNow!

"Kaveri" (2014, 28 nm)
 Socket FM2+, support for PCIe 3.0
 Two or four CPU cores based on the Steamroller microarchitecture
 AMD Heterogeneous System Architecture (HSA) 2.0
 Dual-channel (2× 64 Bit) DDR3 memory controller
 Integrated custom ARM Cortex-A5 co-processor with TrustZone Security Extensions

"Carrizo" (2016, 28 nm)
 Socket FM2+, support for PCIe 3.0
 Four CPU cores based on the Excavator microarchitecture
 Dual-channel (2× 64 Bit) DDR3 memory controller

"Bristol Ridge" (2017, 28 nm) 
 Socket AM4, support for PCIe 3.0
 Four CPU cores based on the Excavator microarchitecture
 Dual-channel DDR4 memory controller
 MMX, SSE(1, 2, 3, 3s, 4a, 4.1, 4.2), AMD64, AMD-V, AES, AVX(1, 1.1, 2), XOP, FMA(4, 3), CVT16, F16C, BMI(ABM, TBM), Turbo Core 3.0, NX bit

See also 
 AMD Bulldozer
 AMD Piledriver
 AMD Accelerated Processing Unit
 List of AMD FX microprocessors

References

External links 

AMD x86 microprocessors